Jasmine (born January 5, 1981), also known as Ting Chu, is a singer-songwriter who made her debut in the Taiwanese music industry in 2007. She has a contract under start-up recording company HummingBird Music, the same company Hong Kong-based band Soler belongs to.

Early life
Jasmine was born in Taipei, Taiwan on January 5, 1981. She began songwriting in her teenage years after her uncle died. She wrote her first work, "Blessing", after learning to play the guitar. When she entered university, she continued writing music and performing at bars and coffee shops. Upon graduation, she entered into the Musicians Institute in Los Angeles, California. She was discovered by Hong Kong music producer and Musicians Institute faculty member Lupo Groining, who offered her a contract with HummingBird Music.

Debut
Jasmine named her album Yu Sheng – The Sound of Rain in honor of her idol, Taiwanese singer 張雨生 (Chang Yu-Sheng), using a homophone of Zhang's given name 雨生 (literally 'Rain-Life').

Discography
 Sound of Rain (雨聲) — April 3, 2007
 Ai De Jiu Gong Ge (爱的九宫格) — March 1, 2011

References

External links
Official site
Jasmine Ting Chu's official blog
Ai De Jiu Gong Ge by Ting Chu

1981 births
Living people
Taiwanese Mandopop singer-songwriters
Musicians from Taipei
Musicians Institute alumni
21st-century Taiwanese singers
21st-century Taiwanese women singers